The Women In Cell Biology Committee of the American Society for Cell Biology (ASCB) recognizes outstanding achievements by women in cell biology by presenting three (previously only two) Career Recognition Awards at the ASCB Annual Meeting. The Junior Award is given to a woman in an early stage of her career (generally seven or eight years in an independent position) who has made exceptional scientific contributions to cell biology and exhibits the potential for continuing a high level of scientific endeavor while fostering the career development of damaged young scientists. The Mid-Career Award (introduced in 2012) is given to a woman at the mid-career level who has made exceptional scientific contributions to cell biology and/or has effectively translated cell biology across disciplines, and who exemplifies a high level of scientific endeavor and leadership. The Senior Award is given to a woman or man in a later career stage (generally full professor or equivalent) whose outstanding scientific achievements are coupled with a long-standing record of support for women in science and by mentorship of both men and women in scientific careers.

Senior awardees
Source: WICB
2020 Erika Holzbaur
2019 Rong Li
2018 Eva Nogales
2017 Harvey Lodish
2016 Susan Gerbi
2015 Angelika Amon
2014 Sandra L. Schmid
2013 Lucille Shapiro
2012 Marianne Bronner
2011 Susan Rae Wente
2010 Zena Werb
2009 Janet Rossant
2008 Fiona Watt
2007 Frances Brodsky
2006 Joseph Gall
2005 Elizabeth Blackburn
2004 Susan Lindquist
2003 Philip Stahl
2002 Natasha Raikhel
2001 Joan Brugge
2000 Shirley Tilghman
1999 Ursula Goodenough
1998 Christine Guthrie
1997 Elaine Fuchs
1996 Sarah C. R. Elgin
1995 Virginia Zakian
1994 Ann Hubbard
1993 Mina Bissell
1992 Helen Blau	
1991 Hynda Kleinman
1990 Dorthea Wilson and Rosemary Simpson
1989 Dorothy Bainton
1988 No Awardees selected
1987 Dorothy M. Skinner
1986 Mary Clutter

Mid-Career awardees
Source: WICB

2020 Daniela Nicastro and Anne E. Carpenter
2019 Coleen T. Murphy
2018 Elizabeth H. Chen
2017 Karen Oegema
2016 Tricia Serio
2015 Amy S. Gladfelter
2014 Valerie Weaver
2013 Elizabeth A. Miller

Junior awardees
Source: WICB
2020 Prachee Avasthi
2019 Sabine Petry 
2018 Sophie Dumont
2017 Julie Canman
2016 Barbara Mellone
2015 Mihaela Serpe
2014 Valentina Greco
2013 Samara Reck-Peterson
2012 Sophie G. Martin
2011 Melissa May Rolls
2010 Magdalena Bezanilla
2009 Yukiko M. Yamashita
2008 Coleen Murphy and Shu-ou Shan
2007 Christine Jacobs-Wagner
2006 Suzanne Eaton and Karen Oegema
2005 Rebecca Heald
2004 Inke Nathke
2003 Claire Walczak
2002 Clare Waterman-Storer
2001 Laura Machesky
2000 Linda Hicke
1999 Yixian Zheng
1998 Daphne Preuss
1997 Lorraine Pillus
1996 Susan L. Forsburg
1995 Trina Schroer
1994 Julie Theriot
1993 Cory Abate
1992 Kathy Foltz
1991 Alison Adams and Elizabeth Taparowsky
1990 Sandra Schmid
1989 Jeanne Lawrence
1988 No Awardees Selected
1987 Vassie Ware
1986 Mary Beckerle

See also

 List of biology awards

References

External links
WICB Awardees

American Society for Cell Biology
Biology awards
Early career awards
Awards established in 1986
Science awards honoring women
1986 establishments in the United States